Michael Hudson may refer to:

 Michael Hudson (admiral) (1933–2005), Australian naval officer
 Michael Hudson (economist) (born 1939), American economist, professor of economics at the University of Missouri, Kansas City
 Michael Hudson (Medal of Honor) (1834–1891), American Medal of Honor recipient
 Michael Hudson (political scientist) (1938–2021), American political scientist and Director of Middle East Institute at the National University of Singapore
 Michael Hudson (reporter) (born 1961), American investigative journalist
 Michael Hudson (Royalist) (1605–1648), chaplain to Charles I and a scoutmaster in the Royalist army
 Michael Derrick Hudson (born 1963), American poet who occasionally used the pseudonym Yi-Fen Chou